Keith Gleeson (born 21 June 1976) is a retired Irish Australian rugby union football player.

Early life 
Gleeson was born in Dublin, Ireland, before moving to Australia with his family as a child. Raised in Sydney, Australia, Gleeson attended Catholic Jesuit school St Aloysius' College representing the schools 1st XV rugby union team over 2 years and as captain in the latter and playing for the CAS 1st XV and the New South Wales 2nd XV. He went on to represent Australia at u/19 and u/21 (Captain).

Professional rugby career 
Gleeson has enjoyed a distinct career, representing Northern Suburbs in the Sydney competition, the NSW Waratahs in the Super 12, Leinster in Ireland and finally most notably Ireland. His preferred position is as an openside flanker. Perhaps the highlight of his career was representing Ireland in the 2003 Rugby World Cup. He stands 1.86 m and his playing weight is 98 kg.
On numerous occasions George Hook has stated that Gleeson should start for Ireland as he feels he is their best openside flanker.
Gleeson retired from professional rugby at the end of the 07/08 season with a  Magners League winners medal.

References

External links
Leinster profile
ERC profile
Sporting Heroes profile

1976 births
Living people
Rugby union flankers
Australian rugby union players
Irish rugby union players
Ireland international rugby union players
Leinster Rugby players
St Mary's College RFC players
Irish emigrants to Australia
People educated at St Aloysius' College (Sydney)
Ireland Wolfhounds international rugby union players
Rugby union players from Dublin (city)
Rugby union players from Sydney
New South Wales Waratahs players